The People vs. Jean Harris is a 1981 American television film directed by George Schaefer and starring Ellen Burstyn as Jean Harris, the convicted murderer of Herman Tarnower. The film was based on the actual transcript of the trial.

For her portrayal as Harris, Burstyn was nominated for the Golden Globe Award for Best Actress – Miniseries or Television Film and the Primetime Emmy Award for Outstanding Lead Actress in a Limited Series or Movie.

Cast
Ellen Burstyn as Jean Harris
Martin Balsam as Joel Arnou
Richard Dysart as Judge Russell R. Leggett
Peter Coyote as George Bolen
Priscilla Morrill as Juanita Edwards
Sarah Marshall as Suzanne van der Vreken
Millie Slavin as Narrator
Al Ruscio as Siciliano

References

External links
 
 

American biographical films
Films set in the 20th century
1981 films
1981 television films
1980s biographical films
NBC network original films
Films directed by George Schaefer
Films scored by Brad Fiedel
1980s English-language films
1980s American films